Vigdis Hårsaker (born July 16, 1981), is a Norwegian handball player, who currently plays club handball for Byåsen IL.

She first played handball for Sjetne, but at age 14, she transferred to Byåsen. Except for the year she went to France to study the language (she was on loan by Byåsen), and the two years in which she moved to Larvik HK, Hårsaker has played most of her professional career in Byåsen.

Hårsaker debuted on the Norwegian national team in 2000, at age 19. Since then, she has played a total of 130 matches, scoring 334 times. She was part of the team that won silver in the 2002 European Championship and a gold in the subsequent 2004 Championship. She has also twice won the silver medal at the World Championship, in 2001, Italy and 2007, France.

Achievements 
2007: World Championship - Silver
2006: Norwegian League (Byåsen IL) - Silver
2005: Norwegian League (Larvik HK) - Gold
EHF Cup Winners Cup (Larvik HK) - Gold
2004: Norwegian League (Larvik HK) - Bronze
European Championship - Gold
Norwegian League Right Back Player of the Year
2002: European Championship - Silver
2001: World Championship - Silver

References

External links

1981 births
Living people
Norwegian female handball players
Expatriate handball players
Norwegian expatriate sportspeople in France